Baumkirchen is a community in the district of Innsbruck Land. It lies in the Inn Valley north of the Inn River on a batter of the Gnadenwald terrace. The village can be reached via the Inn Valley Motorway.

Population

References

External links
 Town History (German)
 Municipality Baumkirchen: Official website of the municipality in the Hall-Wattens region

Cities and towns in Innsbruck-Land District